Elisabeth Enger (born 1 July 1958) is a Norwegian civil servant, from August 2008 director of the Norwegian National Rail Administration.

She was a bureaucrat in Akershus County Municipality from 1980 to 1982, and then consultant and later chief administrative officer (rådmann) in Skodje municipality from 1983 to 1989. She then worked as a director in Norwegian Association of Local and Regional Authorities. She returned as chief administrative officer in Lier from 1994 to 2001 and Bærum from 2001 to 2008.

She has the cand.mag. degree.

References

1958 births
Living people
Directors of government agencies of Norway
Norwegian National Rail Administration people